Francisco Cabrera is an Argentine engineer, born in the Mendoza Province. He became an engineer in electricity in the University of Mendoza, and headed the minister of economic development of Buenos Aires under Mauricio Macri from 2007 to 2015. Macri was elected president in 2015, and appointed him minister of production.

Biography 

Cabrera is an electrical and electronics engineer. He obtained his degree from the University of Mendoza in 1981. He has a Master in Business Administration from the Higher School of Economics and Business Administration.

He began his career at Hewlett-Packard, then went through the Roberts Group, HSBC Group, among other companies.

Social Security 

He founded the pension fund company AFJP and was its CEO.

Media 
Between 2002 and 2007 he was Executive Director of the newspaper La Nación and integrated the directory of the newspapers Los Andes de Mendoza and La Voz del Interior de Córdoba.

Think Foundation 
In 2010 he was elected president of the Pensar Foundation, the Proposal Republican think tank dedicated to the study, research and development of public policies.

Minister of Economic Development of the City of Buenos Aires 
One of the policies he carried out was the creation of the so-called Creative Districts, which are poles of the City of Buenos Aires where specific activities related to culture and innovation are concentrated, such as the Technology District of Parque Patricios, the Audiovisual District in Palermo, Chacarita, Villa Ortúzar, Colegiales and Paternal, the Arts District in La Boca, etc.

Minister of Production of the Nation 
On December 10, 2015 he was appointed as Minister of Production of the Nation by Mauricio Macri.

During its management, the SME Law, which gives tax benefits to small and medium-sized enterprises and the Entrepreneurs Law, which created a new corporate type, simplified stock companies (SAS), whose constitution demands less requirements than other companies, such as anonymous and limited liability. In this law the figure of the repentant was also instituted to denounce posters and the National Competition Authority was created, a decentralized body of the Executive Branch in which the Court of Defense of Competition and the Secretaries of Instruction for Anti-Competitive and Concentration Behaviors operate Economic, whose function is to impose fines and penalties.

On June 16, 2018 he was replaced in his position by Dante Sica and appointed as president of the Investment and Foreign Trade Bank and Ad-Honorem advisor to President Mauricio Macri.

References

Production ministers of Argentina
Republican Proposal politicians
University of Mendoza alumni
Living people
Knights Grand Cross of the Order of Isabella the Catholic
People from Mendoza Province
Year of birth missing (living people)